John Derby Smith (April 9, 1812 – April 26, 1884), was an American minister, physician, and Massachusetts state legislator.

Smith, the youngest son of Nathan Smith, Doctor of Medicine, Professor of Medicine in Dartmouth College, was born in Hanover, New Hampshire, April 9, 1812. The year after his birth his father became the head of the newly organized Medical Institution of Yale College.

He graduated from Yale College in 1832. In 1833 he entered the Yale Divinity School, and after two years there and two in the Andover Theological Seminary, he was licensed to preach in 1837. After a brief employment as acting pastor in Athol, Massachusetts, he was ordained, November 20, 1839, pastor of the Second Congregational Church in Charlemont, Massachusetts, where he continued until August 11, 1844.

Then, on the partial failure of his health, he took up the study of medicine, and received a diploma from the Baltimore Medical College in 1846. In June 1848, he was resettled over his former charge in Charlemont, which he finally left in May 1852, though for some time longer residing in the town, which he represented in the State Legislature in 1854. He supplied the pulpit in Berkley, Massachusetts, from 1854 to 1858, and in Douglas, Massachusetts, from 1860 to 1863, when he entered the U.S. Army as a contract-surgeon.

After the close of the American Civil War, he was for a short time a clerk in the Treasury Department at Washington, and in July 1867, received the appointment of acting assistant surgeon in the U.S, Navy.  At the close of four years' charge of the Naval Hospital in Pensacola, Florida, his health was so far broken by attacks of fever that he was ordered home on sick leave. His later years were spent in the village of Scotland, in Bridgewater, Massachusetts, where he died, of congestion of the liver, April 26, 1884, aged 72 years.

He married, March 17, 1837, Sarah, daughter of Garry Bacon, of Woodbury, Conn., who died May 11, 1848. He next married, April 22, 1849, Mary M. Dole, of Charlemont, who died March 30, 1854; he was again named, April 12, 1855, to Susan A. eldest daughter of Dr. J. H. Anthony, of Providence, Rhode Island, who died June 10, 1883. He left a large family of children; one son by his third marriage received the degree of M.D. at Yale in 1878.

External links

1812 births
1884 deaths
19th-century American clergy
19th-century American politicians
People from Hanover, New Hampshire
Yale Divinity School alumni
American Congregationalist ministers
United States Navy Medical Corps officers
University of Maryland School of Medicine alumni
Members of the Massachusetts General Court
People from Bridgewater, Massachusetts
People from Charlemont, Massachusetts
People from Berkley, Massachusetts
People from Douglas, Massachusetts
Civilian doctors serving the Union Army
Yale College alumni
Military personnel from Massachusetts